Reality Bites is a British comedy panel game show presented by Stephen Mulhern. The programme made its debut on ITV2 on 5 February 2015. In each episode two teams of three compete and they are captained by Emma Willis and Joel Dommett. The questions and tasks are about reality television from around the world.

Format
The Real World: The teams watch clips from foreign reality shows and have to work out what the show is all about.
Reality Star in a Reasonably Priced Bar: Reality show participants go into a bar to see how many people recognise them. The teams must guess the number.
Where The Hell Am I?: A member of each team is blindfolded and challenged to identify a well-known reality show and reality star by using touch alone.
Big Fact Hunt: The teams have to guess whether a series of facts Stephen has uncovered about a different star each week are true or false. These will be confirmed by the star themselves, live in the studio.

Episodes
The coloured backgrounds denote the result of each of the shows:

 – indicates Emma's team won.
 – indicates Joel's team won.
 – indicates the game ended in a draw

References

External links

2010s British comedy television series
2010s British game shows
2015 British television series debuts
2015 British television series endings
English-language television shows
ITV comedy
ITV panel games
Television series by Hungry Bear Media
Television game shows with incorrect disambiguation